Quilla Hugh "Porky" Freeman (June 29, 1916 in Vera Cruz, Missouri, United States – July 8, 2001) was an American Western swing performer, bandleader, and songwriter. He was also an electric guitar pioneer and inventor.

In the 1940s he led the Californian based band, the 'Porky Freeman Trio'. One of his early hits, "Porky's Boogie Woogie on Strings", began rock and roll's evolution out of Western swing. As a session musician he backed many of the popular musicians of the time.

His early experimentation with the electric guitar led to several patents for the instrument. One of the patents, 'Single Pickup Frequency Control For String Instrument', led to legal wrangling with Fender.

Discography 

note: [bracketed numbers] = matrix numbers, (v) = vocal, (i) = instrumental track

Compilations
 The Boogie Woogie Boy (Cattle Compact [Germany] CCD-294, 2000)

References

Songwriters from Missouri
American bandleaders
Guitarists from Missouri
Western swing performers
Apex Records artists
Four Star Records artists
1916 births
2001 deaths
20th-century American guitarists